The 2013 women's road cycling season was the third for Team Argos–Shimano, which began as Team Skil-Argos in 2010.

Roster

Season victories

Results in major races

Single day races

Grand Tours

UCI World Ranking

The team finished eight in the UCI ranking for teams.

References

2013 UCI Women's Teams seasons
2013 in Dutch sport
2013 in women's road cycling
2013